Roy Heinrich, born Elroy Paul Heinrich, Jr., July 31, 1953, is a country music singer and songwriter born in Houston, Texas. Heinrich began singing Country music in Los Angeles in 1989. After moving to Austin, Texas in the fall of 1992, Heinrich has established himself as Roots/Honky Tonk Country Music artist. He has participated in Austin's South by Southwest music festivals for several years.

Discography

Albums
 After All This Time, 1993 CD
 Listen To Your Heart, 1996 CD
 Smokey Night in a Bar, 1999 CD
 Playin' Favorites, 2002 CD
 All Night All Day, 2008 CD

External links
 Roy Heinrich

American country singer-songwriters
1953 births
Living people